Manon Bresch (born 4 January 1998) is a French-Cameroonian actress.

Biography
Bresch attended the drama school Cours Florent in Paris for twelve years. She has Cameroonian ancestry and has visited there on vacation. Bresch made her film debut in 2012, with a small role in Les Papas du dimanche.

Bresch began playing Yasmine, a close friend of Salomé, in the TV series Clem in 2015. In September 2015, Bresch was cast as Thérèse Marci, the adopted daughter of Thomas and Gabriel, in the soap opera Plus belle la vie. The actress who originally played the character, Tia Diagne, left to pursue other acting opportunities. In 2017, Bresch played Charlotte Castillon, a young jogger who is inexplicably murdered in plain sight, in the TV film Noir enigma. Bresch starred as Luisa, a student with abilities in voodoo, in the 2019 supernatural murder-mystery TV series Mortel. In 2020, she played Sirley, a troublesome student from French Guiana, in Maledetta primavera.

In addition to French, Bresch speaks English and some Spanish. She practices judo, tennis, and contemporary dance.

Filmography

Films
2012 : Les Papas du dimanche as a child
2016 : We Are Family as a friend of Oscar
2018 : I'm Going Out for Cigarettes (short film)
2020 : The Third War
2020 : Maledetta primavera as Sirley
2023 : Une zone à défendre as Fred

Television
2015 - 2018 : Clem as Yasmine
2015 - 2019 : Plus belle la vie as Thérèse Marci
2017 : Noir enigma as Charlotte Castillon
2017 : Des jours meilleurs as Cindy
2018 : Watch Me Burn as Clara
2019 : Les Grands as Maya
2019 : Mortel as Luisa Manjimbe
2020 : Baron Noir as Lucie

References

External links
Manon Bresch at the Internet Movie Database

1994 births
Living people
Cameroonian actresses
Actresses from Paris